Charlotte Booth (born 6 April 1975) is a British archaeologist and writer on ancient Egypt.

Biography 
Booth earned both her Bachelor's and her master's degrees in Egyptian Archaeology at University College London.  After graduating, Booth started teaching for Birkbeck, University of London. Her focus of study at university was the Hyksos period of Egypt. In 2018, she received her Doctor of Philosophy (PhD) degree from the University of Birmingham: her doctoral thesis was titled "Excavating paper squeezes: identifying the value of nineteenth and early twentieth century squeezes of ancient Egyptian monuments, through the collections of seven UK archives".

She also provides online lessons on various topics of Egyptian history, like hieroglyphics, a day in Ancient Egypt, etc., on her online learning website, CharlotteEgypt. She has written a number of non-academic books about various aspects of Egyptology.

In 2015 she worked for Museum of London Archaeology (MOLA) as an on site archaeologist at the Bedlam dig Liverpool Street, London.

She   has also  appeared on several history television programs, including: Channel 5 (UK) "Cleopatra: Mother, Mistress, Murderer, Queen", which aired April 2016; 
The History Channel's "Sex in the Ancient World – Egyptian Erotica"  which aired in 2009; and also on The Paul O'Grady Show – "Mummification", which aired in 2006.

Publications 

Charlotte Booth: How to Survive in Ancient Egypt  (Pen & Sword Books Ltd, 2020) 
Charlotte Booth: Hypatia: Mathematician, Philosopher, Myth  (Stroud, Gloucestershire Fonthill Media, 2017) 
Charlotte Booth: The Pyramids in a Nutshell  (2016) 
Charlotte Booth: In Bed with the Ancient Egyptians  (Stroud, Gloucestershire Amberley Publishing, 2015) 288 pp. 
Charlotte Booth: Lost Voices of the Nile: Everyday Life in Ancient Egypt   (Amberley Publishing, 2015) 304 pp. 
Charlotte Booth: An Illustrated Introduction to Ancient Egypt  (Stroud, Gloucestershire : Amberley, 2014.) 93 pp. 
Charlotte Booth: The Myth of Ancient Egypt  (Stroud : Amberley, 2011.) 192 pp.  
Charlotte Booth: The Nile and Its People: 7000 Years of Egyptian History  (Stroud : History Press, 2010.) 191 pp. 
Charlotte Booth: Horemheb: The Forgotten Pharaoh (Stroud, Gloucestershire : Amberley, 2009) 160 pp,  
Charlotte Booth: The Curse of the Mummy: And Other Mysteries of Ancient Egypt (Oxford : Oneworld, 2009.)  211 pp. 
Charlotte Booth: Traveller's Guide to the Ancient World: Egypt: In the Year 1200 BCE (Traveller's Guide to the Ancient World) (2008) 
Charlotte Booth: The Boy Behind the Mask: Meeting the Real Tutankhamun  (Oxford, England : Oneworld Publications, 2007.) 176 pages. 
Charlotte Booth: The Ancient Egyptians for Dummies   (John Wiley, 2007).  
Charlotte Booth: People of Ancient Egypt  (Stroud : Tempus, 2006.)  288 pp. 
Charlotte Booth: The Hyksos period in Egypt. (Princes Risborough, Shire 2005). 56 pp.  
Charlotte Booth: The role of Foreigners in Ancient Egypt.   Oxford, England : Archaeopress, 2005 76pp.

See also
 List of Egyptologists

References

External links
 Archived version of CharlottesEgypt.com
 

British archaeologists
Living people
1975 births
British women archaeologists
British Egyptologists
Alumni of University College London
Academics of Birkbeck, University of London
21st-century British writers
21st-century British women writers
21st-century archaeologists
Biographers of Hypatia
British women historians